Gorn (stylized as GORN) is a 2019 virtual reality game developed by Free Lives and published by Devolver Digital. The player is a gladiator who fights opponents to death in arena using weapons at their disposal. The game was launched in early access in 2016, and had a full release on July 18, 2019 for Microsoft Windows. A PlayStation VR version released in 2020 and an Oculus Quest port followed in 2021. An updated version for the PlayStation VR2 will be released March 16, 2023.

Gameplay 

In the menu, the player can choose which warrior to play as, each with different strengths. Gorn is a wave based game; the player has to clear the arena of enemies to progress. At the start of each wave, the player is offered a choice between weapons. Gorn has weapons such as spears, sledgehammers, and crab claws that can be used to dispatch opponents. The game features a dismemberment system, which allows the player to chop a limb off to disable or kill an enemy. Clearing a certain number of waves leads to a boss fight that the player needs to complete to progress. If the player takes damage, the edge of the screen turns red, and if the player doesn't manage to kill an enemy before the screen goes completely red, they have to restart from a checkpoint.

Development 
A game designer from Free Lives stated that the idea for the game had come from playing early VR games like #SelfieTennis and Budget Cuts and seeing people messing with ragdoll physics in each game. The team decided to build a game entirely around the feature, building a small prototype to test the idea. Additionally, the game was made due to the lack of VR games with melee combat at the time. Speaking on the game's violence, the developer said, "I find games that portray “realistic” violence unsettling, and I typically don’t play games that feature real wars. I don’t feel there’s anything wrong with creating or enjoying those works— it’s just not for me. On the other hand, I’ve never found cartoon violence offensive or unsettling, depending on the context and tone. Canonically, the gladiators in GORN are there of their own volition, so the violence is consensual, for whatever that’s worth." He commented that the gladiator setting was so far removed from the modern world that he didn't think the game showed any real suffering. The developer also added that they felt that the violence shouldn't be required to enjoy the game, which is why a toggle to turn the gladiators into piñatas was added. 

The team mostly relied on player feedback for the weapons, tuning the weight and feel of them over the course of early access. The visuals were designed to be seen with the low resolutions of older VR headsets, so they prioritized readability in the characters and world design. The developer mentioned some lessons they brought to Gorn from Broforce was not to take the game too seriously and to focus on giving the player freedom over more restrictive design. Later in early access, a local multiplayer mode was added that let a second player control a gladiator with a gamepad. The optimizations made for the PSVR version helped Free Lives to quickly make the Oculus Quest version. The team faced issues in terms of the framerate and resolution they had to hit on the Quest, which they solved by reworking the shaders and optimizing all of the art assets. 

The game does not currently have any major content updates planned.

Reception 
Gorn received "generally favorable" to "mixed or average" reviews according to Metacritic. The PSVR version received “mixed to average reviews.””

UploadVR's Jamie Feltham gave the game a positive review, writing that, "It’s a game of violent experimentation, discovering what twisted new means of punishment you can dish out with each passing weapon. Not everything is an effective killing machine but, more importantly, they’re mostly a heck of a lot of fun to use." He was more mixed on the game's lack of content, "And yet, for all the laughs, you can’t help but wish there was something a little meatier here. You can see through Gorn’s handful of levels in a few hours."

Jordan Devore of Destructoid felt that while Gorn wasn't revolutionary, its unique weapons helped differentiate it from other wave based VR games. "Gorn isn’t exactly revelatory – especially not as the medium reaches new heights with substantial narrative games like Half-Life: Alyx – but it is a joyful reminder of just how entertaining interactions can be in a virtual setting. Gorn‘s wow factor is found in its absurd weapons, not its structure or story." Devore disliked the PSVR tracking, "During the final few levels, it seemed like the aging tech couldn’t quite keep up with what the game was asking me to do, and as a result, some of the gaps between checkpoints felt way too long. I had my share of frustrating moments, especially while facing bosses with highly specific weak-points."

References 

Fighting games
PlayStation 4 games
PlayStation VR games
Meta Quest games
Video games developed in South Africa
Virtual reality games
Windows games
2019 video games